Liu Chengming (born 4 February 1998) is a Chinese diver. In 2018, he won the silver medal in the men's 1 metre springboard event at the 2018 Asian Games held in Jakarta, Indonesia. In 2019, he won the gold medal in both the men's 1 metre and 3 metre springboard events at the 2019 Summer Universiade held in Naples, Italy.

References 

Living people
1998 births
Place of birth missing (living people)
Chinese male divers
Divers at the 2018 Asian Games
Medalists at the 2018 Asian Games
Asian Games silver medalists for China
Asian Games medalists in diving
Universiade medalists in diving
Universiade gold medalists for China
Medalists at the 2019 Summer Universiade
21st-century Chinese people